Beaulieu Park railway station is a planned station on the Great Eastern Main Line in the East of England that will serve a new development in Boreham, approximately  to the north-east of Chelmsford, Essex. It was originally expected to open in 2019, though due to numerous issues, mainly relating to funding, this date has been pushed back number of times to 2026. 

The development will include thousands of new residential dwellings, three schools, a business park, surgery, hotel, and parkland, as well as the station which will also serve the neighbourhoods of Boreham and Springfield to help relieve congestion at Chelmsford's main station. 

In August 2019 the then Chancellor of the Exchequer, Sajid Javid, agreed £218 million from the Housing Infrastructure Fund for the new station and associated road improvements, with the aim of unlocking up to 14,000 new homes.

References 

Proposed railway stations in England
Boreham